Baltic Robinson: 2002, was the third version of Expedition Robinson, or Survivor to air in the Baltic region of Europe. This season premiered on October 5, 2002 and aired until December 15, 2002. Like in the first two seasons, the three tribes were divided based on the contestants country of origin. Along with this, each tribe was given the name of the country of its contestants origin in that country's native language. As the first twist of the season, in episode one all three tribes were forced to vote out one member. What the contestants didn't know was that these three eliminated players would later return to the game after the merge in episode five. As there were twelve players in the merge tribe and three finalists, there was a nine-member jury. As each country had to be represented in the final three, contestant Ranno Rätsep became a finalist in episode eight when Maris Valdre, the only other remaining member of the Estonian tribe left in the game, was voted out. Because of this, Ranno was immune from the final elimination challenge in episode ten when all remaining Latvian and Lithuanian contestants had to compete against contestants from their home country for a spot in the final three. Ultimately, it was Rimas Valeikis of Lithuania who won the season with 4 votes against him, the runner up was Estonian Ranno Rätsep with 6 votes against him and the second runner up was Latvian Kristine Koļadina with 8 votes against her given by the jury.

Finishing order

Voting history

As Kristina and Ranno both lost plank, they each had additional votes against them at the final tribal council.

References

External links
http://www.delfi.ee/news/meelelahutus/robinson/
https://web.archive.org/web/20021119180129/http://www.delfi.ee/news/meelelahutus/robinson/
https://web.archive.org/web/20030228130231/http://www.tv3.lt/index.phtml?page_type=document&document=22658
https://web.archive.org/web/20021014151613/http://www.tv3.ee/index.phtml?nav=&page_type=document&document=17230
https://web.archive.org/web/20020625195113/http://www.tv3.lv/index.phtml?nav=&page_type=document&document=11424

Baltic
Latvian television shows
Lithuanian television shows
Estonian television shows
2000s Estonian television series
2000s Latvian television series
2000s Lithuanian television series
2000s reality television series
2002 Estonian television seasons
2002 Latvian television seasons
2002 Lithuanian television seasons